Junior Atemengue (born 1 July 1995) is a Cameroonian professional footballer.

References

External links 
 
 Profile at Neman Grodno website

1995 births
Living people
Cameroonian footballers
Association football forwards
Cameroonian expatriate footballers
Expatriate footballers in Morocco
Expatriate footballers in Thailand
Expatriate footballers in Belarus
Expatriate footballers in Ghana
Renaissance FC de Ngoumou players
Tonnerre Yaoundé players
Union Douala players
Junior Atemengue
Junior Atemengue
APEJES Academy players
Chabab Atlas Khénifra players
MC Oujda players
FC Neman Grodno players
FC Energetik-BGU Minsk players
Bechem United F.C. players